Mara Maionchi (born 22 April 1941 in Bologna) is an Italian record producer and a TV personality.

Biography
Mara began her career in 1967, as secretary in the Ariston Records press office, working with Ornella Vanoni and Mino Reitano. She is married with Alberto Salerno (son of Nicola Salerno, songwriter of hits like Torero, Tu vuò fà l'americano, Guaglione, Non ho l'età e Un ragazzo di strada) and has two daughters Giulia and Camilla, who are her press officers.

In 1969 she reached the Numero Uno, record label founded by Mogol and Lucio Battisti. The experience with the pair of authors led her, in the 1970s, to the Dischi Ricordi, where she became a talent discoverer of singers like Gianna Nannini. Later, she became art director, following the musical path of Fabrizio De André and Mia Martini and helped to popularize Mango.

In the 1990s, she met Tiziano Ferro in SanremoLab academy and produced his first three albums.

Completing the experience with the Nisa, she founded with her husband and the daughters the record label Non ho l'età, with the aim of promoting new musical talents.

In 2008, she became X Factor judge on Rai 2, with Morgan and Simona Ventura. In year-end she hosts with Francesco Facchinetti on the same channel Saturday show Scalo 76.

In 2009 she was confirmed for the second and the third series, with the same judges, and for the third series with Morgan and Claudia Mori, wife of Adriano Celentano.

In 2010, she was also in the fourth edition with three new judges: Elio, Enrico Ruggeri and Anna Tatangelo. She also released a dance single called Fantastic that peaked at #2 in the Italian Singles Chart. She was confirmed for her participation at the talent show Amici di Maria De Filippi in 2011.

Maionchi did not return for the fifth edition of X Factor in 2011 and was replaced by Arisa.

In 2012 she became jury president of Videofestival live, a showcase for new talents whose finality is broadcast every year by Canale Italia.

In 2013 she became a leader in the fourth edition of the talent show Io canto, with Claudio Cecchetto and Flavia Cercato.

In 2014 she began acting as a radio broadcaster in the program Benvenuti nella giungla on Radio 105, with Gianluigi Paragone. In the same year she returned to X Factor for the eighth edition, not as a judge but as the lead player of the Xtra Factor talk show on Sky Uno. She also played the same role for ninth and tenth edition of X-Factor. On 19 May 2017, her participation was announced for the 11th edition of the Talent, again in the role of a judge. she became the winning for the first time in season 11 with Lorenzo Licitra from the over 25s category and again for the second time in season 12 with Anastasio from the boys category.

In 2021 she conducted together with Fedez the Italian program LOL - Chi ride è fuori.

Filmography

Films

Television

References

External links
XFactor Italia

Italian record producers
Italian television personalities
1941 births
Living people
Women record producers
Women television personalities
Mass media people from Bologna